The Journal of Applied Physics is a peer-reviewed scientific journal with a focus on the physics of modern technology. The journal was originally established in 1931  under the name of Physics, and was published by the American Physical Society for its first 7 volumes. In January 1937, ownership was transferred to the American Institute of Physics "in line with the efforts of the American Physical Society to enhance the standing of physics as a profession". The journal's current editor-in-chief is André Anders (Lawrence Berkeley National Laboratory). According to the Journal Citation Reports, the journal has a 2021 impact factor of 2.877.

References

External links 
 

Physics journals
Weekly journals
Publications established in 1931
English-language journals
American Institute of Physics academic journals
Hybrid open access journals